The 2008-09 season was the 11th season for the Black Bears. The Black Bears had an overall record of 5 wins, 23 losses and 5 ties. Their Hockey East conference record was 4 wins, 15 losses and 2 ties. Jennie Gallo led the team in goals for the second consecutive year. Myriam Croussette led all freshman in scoring and Jenna Ouellette led the team with five power play goals

Regular season

Schedule

Highlights
October 17–18: Abby Barton scored goals in back-to-back games against Sacred Heart 
October 18: Jennie Gallo had a hat-trick and two assists against Sacred Heart. Myriam Croussette scored her first collegiate goal and had three assists in the game. Dawn Sullivan scored her first collegiate goal against Sacred Heart
November 16: Abby Barton scored a goal in the upset over Boston College   
January 30: Myriam Croussette scored twice and notched an assist against Northeastern 
February 13–14: Myriam Croussette scored a goal in back-to-back games versus Connecticut

Player stats

Skaters

Goaltenders

Awards and honors
Abby Barton was named a Maine Scholar-Athlete Award winner. 
Abby Barton was named to the Hockey East Academic All-Star Team.
 Myriam Croussette was named a Maine Scholar-Athlete Rising Star
 Myriam Croussette was named to the Hockey East Academic Honor Roll
 Jenna Ouellette, Maine Scholar-Athlete Award winner
 Jenna Ouellette was named to the Hockey East Academic Honor Roll.
 Dawn Sullivan was named a Maine Scholar-Athlete *Rising Star*
 Dawn Sullivan was named to the Hockey East Academic Honor Roll.
Genevieve Turgeon was named Hockey East Honorable Mention. 
Genevieve Turgeon set a school record for saves in a season 
Genevieve Turgeon was named a Hockey East Distinguished Scholar.

References

Maine Black Bears women's ice hockey seasons
Maine Black Bears Women's Ice Hockey Season, 2008-09
Black
Black